Dana Martanová is a retired Czechoslovak slalom canoeist who competed in the mid-1950s. She won three medals at the ICF Canoe Slalom World Championships with two golds (Mixed C-2: 1955; Folding K-1 team: 1953) and a bronze (Folding K-1: 1953).

References

Czechoslovak female canoeists
Possibly living people
Year of birth missing (living people)
Medalists at the ICF Canoe Slalom World Championships